Madeleine Slavick is an American author and photographer whose work is notable for crossing cultural barriers.

Biography
Madeleine Marie Slavick was born in the United States. She has four sisters, including Susanne Slavick, Sarah Slavick, and Elin O’Hara Slavick.
lived in the United States for 25 years, and in Hong Kong for 25 years, before moving to New Zealand in 2012. Her photographs have been exhibited internationally. 

Reviewer Bradley Winterton in the Taipei Times described Slavick's Delicate Access as having "poise and a terse intelligence" with "nothing unbuttoned" and having a "minimalist concentration." Reviewer Tammy Ho in the Asian Review of Books described her poetry as transforming small and "seemingly insignificant things" into "meaning-loaded symbols." Reviewer Michael Ingham described her poem Mong kok Market, about life in Hong Kong, as depicting the "instant slaughter one cannot avoid witnessing at the live meat and fish stalls." 

Slavick stated, "In the projects I undertake, I try to create a sense of community which enriches me, the other participants, and the audience."

Publications and exhibitions 
  Finalist, Parkin Prize, New Zealand, 2022
  Essay 'The Yellow Chair' published in Asian Cha (Hong Kong), Monday Artpost (Toronto), and Guernica (New York), 2022
  'Madeleine Slavick's Art of Looking' by David Mealing, in EyeContact and PhotoForum, 2021
  Photography published in D-Photo, New Zealand, 2020
  Family Tree Whakapapa - elin o'Hara, Madeleine, Sarah and Susanne Slavick / Exhibition: Aratoi Museum, and Wallace Arts Centre, New Zealand, 2020-2021
 Essay on Family Tree Whakapapa  by Erin Kavanagh-Hall
  Writing/Photography published in various New Zealand publications: Art News, Art New Zealand, Blue Five Notebook, Bonsai - Best small stories from Aotearoa New Zealand, Broadsheet, Flash Frontier, Jacket, Love in the Time of Covid, Poetry in Multicultural Oceania, Poetry New Zealand, Sweet Mammalian, Takahe, and Tuesday Poem
  Photography portfolio featured in PhotoForum, New Zealand, with an essay by Janet Bayly, 2019
  Photography exhibited in 2019 Wairarapa Art Review, Selector: Karl Chitham
  Photography published in My Body, My Business: New Zealand sex workers in an era of change (Dunedin: Otago University Press, 2018) 
  HONG KONG SONG - solo photography exhibition, The Wallace Arts Centre, Auckland, 2016; and Aratoi Wairarapa Museum of Art and History, Masterton, 2015
  RED - solo photography exhibition, Victoria University of Wellington, 2015
 FIFTY STORIES, FIFTY IMAGES - book of prose and photography, Hong Kong: MCCM Creations, 2012
 GHOST RECORDS - with Luo Hui, published in ArtPost 2010, exhibited in Toronto, 2011
 SOMETHING BEAUTIFUL MIGHT HAPPEN, book of poetry with photography by Shimao Shinzo, Tokyo: Usimaoda Books, 2010
 CHINA VOICES , co-editor, book of non-fiction, Hong Kong: Oxfam, 2010
 MY FAVOURITE THING, curator of exhibition in Hong Kong; co-editor of book of non-fiction, published in Beijing: Joint Publishing, 2005; and Taipei 2006 
 DELICATE ACCESS, solo exhibition in Hong Kong; book published with Chinese translations by Luo Hui, Hong Kong: Sixth Finger Press, 2004
 COLO(U)R, ebook, exhibition, postcards, from 2003RECONSIDERED CROSSINGS - Representation beyond Hybridity", group exhibition, Hong Kong and Vienna, 2001-2
 ROUND – Poems and Photographs of Asia, poetry and photography exhibition (Hong Kong and Cairo); book published with Barbara Baker in Hong Kong: Asia 2000 Publishers, 1998 
 FLESH & BLOOD - group exhibition in USA from 1997, and in Hong Kong, 2000
 TOGETHER, solo exhibition at five locations in Hong Kong and Singapore, 1996
 Solo exhibition at Hong Kong Fringe Club, 1991
 Daily blog from 2010 - 2014

References

Living people
21st-century American poets
21st-century American writers
21st-century American women writers
American poets
American photographers
American editors
American women poets
American women photographers
American women editors
Chinese women editors
Hong Kong artists
Hong Kong women artists
People from Carterton, New Zealand
Year of birth missing (living people)